Dowdales School which was founded 1928, is a community, comprehensive school in Dalton-in-Furness, Cumbria for anyone, in the age range 11–16. There are approximately 1000 pupils on roll.

The school was originally based on the former Ashburner House, which is still a part of the school. The name of Dowdales derives from the adjacent field known as Peter Dowdales' Field.

On 28 August 2010, The Dowdales Year 7 Rugby Team defeated Temple Moor at Wembley, to Win the Carnegie Schools Trophy.

Fire
On 16 September 2011, there was a fire reported in the school's Design & Technology block, within one of the Food Technology classrooms, from a faulty tumble dryer. All students and staff were evacuated and the students were later sent home. Two members of staff were sent to hospital, but both were released with no injuries from Furness General Hospital the same day. Because of this, the school was closed for two days, but reopened on Wednesday 21 September to all pupils. The DT block was reopened at the start of the second half term of the summer.

References

External links
School website
Ofsted report
Stats on BBC

Secondary schools in Cumbria
Educational institutions established in 1928
1928 establishments in England
Community schools in Cumbria
Dalton-in-Furness